Farab may refer to:
 Farab, Ardabil
 Farab, Markazi
 Qarab (disambiguation)